Love the Cause and Cure of Grief is a 1743 tragedy by the British writer Thomas Cooke. It is a revised version of Cooke's earlier published but unperformed play The Mournful Nuptials.

It premiered at the Theatre Royal, Drury Lane with a cast that included Dennis Delane as Weldon, Henry Giffard as Briar, William Havard as Young Freeman, Richard Winstone as Judge and Anna Marcella Giffard as Charlotte.

References

Bibliography
 Baines, Paul & Ferarro, Julian & Rogers, Pat. The Wiley-Blackwell Encyclopedia of Eighteenth-Century Writers and Writing, 1660-1789. Wiley-Blackwell, 2011.
 Watson, George. The New Cambridge Bibliography of English Literature: Volume 2, 1660–1800. Cambridge University Press, 1971.

1743 plays
Tragedy plays
West End plays
British plays